Pierre-Yves Ngawa (born 9 February 1992) is a Belgian footballer who currently plays for OH Leuven in the Belgian Pro League.

Career
Ngawa started his professional career with Standard Liège, but was immediately loaned out to Sint-Truiden. After a disappointing season, Sint-Truiden relegated to the Belgian Second Division, but the loan deal was extended for another season and Ngawa enjoyed promotion back to the Belgian Pro League as Sint-Truiden became champions in the second division. Ngawa then returned to Standard Liège and during the buildup of the season he received his first start in the Europa League qualifying phase against Skoda Xanthi. Nevertheless, he was loaned to Újpest where he featured regularly and even won the 2013–14 Magyar Kupa including playing the full 120 minutes during the final. Ngawa then came back to Belgium as he signed for Lierse, with whom he suffered relegation to the Belgian Second Division again. Newly promoted OH Leuven offered him a contract in 2015, allowing him to stay in the Belgian Pro League for one season before relegating yet again. Ngawa thereafter featured regularly at the second level in the 2017–18 Belgian First Division B with OH Leuven, before moving to Serie B team Avellino in the summer of 2017. On 31 January 2019, Ngawa joined on loan to Foggia with an obligation to buy.

Honours
Újpest
Hungarian Cup (1): 2013–14

References

External links

1992 births
Living people
Footballers from Liège
Belgian people of Democratic Republic of the Congo descent
Belgian footballers
Belgium under-21 international footballers
Belgium youth international footballers
Belgian expatriate footballers
Association football defenders
Belgian Pro League players
Challenger Pro League players
Nemzeti Bajnokság I players
Standard Liège players
Sint-Truidense V.V. players
Újpest FC players
Lierse S.K. players
Oud-Heverlee Leuven players
U.S. Avellino 1912 players
A.C. Perugia Calcio players
Calcio Foggia 1920 players
Expatriate footballers in Hungary
Expatriate footballers in Italy
Serie B players
Association football midfielders